Sigmund Frogn (26 March 1904 – 31 January 1990) was a Norwegian footballer. He played in one match for the Norway national football team in 1924.

References

External links
 

1904 births
1990 deaths
Norwegian footballers
Norway international footballers
Footballers from Oslo
Association football forwards
Frigg Oslo FK players